Democratic Labour Party of Lithuania (LDDP) was the renamed Communist Party of Lithuania. It was a political party in Lithuania in the 1990s, which claimed to be social-democratic. The youth organization of LDDP was called Lithuanian Labourist Youth Union (Lietuvos leiboristų jaunimo unija).

History 
The party traced its roots to December 1989, when the Communist Party of Lithuania broke away from the main party. CPL (independent) (as it became known after formation of (CPL (CPSU)) took part in 1990 Lithuanian Supreme Soviet election, in which the party came at second place. Amid this position, CPL (independent) joined national unity government, which included almost all parties and organisations in the Supreme Council except CPL (CPSU), Lithuanian Democratic Party (LDP) and the Association of Poles in Lithuania (ZPL). Algirdas Brazauskas became Deputy Prime Minister of Lithuania in Prunskienė Cabinet.

By the autumn of 1990 there were several party's name proposals (etc. Lietuvos socialistų partija (Socialist Party of Lithuania), Lietuvos socialinės pažangos partija (Social Advancement Party of Lithuania), Lietuvos komunistų partija (Communist Party of Lithuania), Lietuvos demokratinė darbo partija (Democratic Labour Party of Lithuania)). In December 1990, the main body of the CPL reorganized as the DLPL.

By the late winter of 1992, the party overtook Sąjūdis as the most supported political party in Lithuania. The LDDP won the 1992 parliamentary election, gaining 43% of the vote giving it 73 seats in the Seimas. It is the best results for any political party in Lithuanian parliamentary election up to this date. LDDP was led by Algirdas Brazauskas. Because Brazauskas was elected as the first president in 1993, he was required to stop his activities in any parties. Adolfas Šleževičius became the party leader and the Prime Minister. After Šleževičius was charged with corruption in 1996, he was replaced by Česlovas Juršėnas.

In 1996 parliamentary election, LDDP got about 9.5% of the votes and won 10 seats in the parliament. In next few years party's support remained the same. The party remained the main opposition party in Seimas, although its member and former Prime Minister Laurynas Mindaugas Stankevičius was Minister of Heath in Vagnorius Cabinet between 1998 and 1999. Prior 2000 parliamentary election LDDP formed a coalition with the Social Democratic Party of Lithuania, the New Democracy Party and the Union of the Russians of Lithuania. Electoral coalition was named after Algirdas Brazauskas and it won majority of the votes. In this coalition, parties formed joint list in nationwide constituency, but in single-member constituencies coalition stood only one candidate per one constituency. It was persisted to avoid vote splitting. In the elections LDDP came with 26 seats (the largest number of seats among coalition's parties and third largest number of seats in the parliament).

In 2001, LDDP merged with the Lithuanian Social Democratic Party to form the Social Democratic Party of Lithuania (Lithuanian: Lietuvos socialdemokratų partija).

Popular support 

In the first half of 1990s, LDDP had around twenty per cent support nationally. This support was not uniform – mainly the party had largest support in large cities with large factories and Russian speaking communities (e. g. Klaipėda). The only exception of large cities was Kaunas, where Sąjūdis (and later the Homeland Union) had greater support. In rural areas party's support came from districts with developed industry (e. g. Kelmė district).

As Lithuania became a service economy in the late 1990s, the party's support declined to ten per cent. The other loss of voters came from parties representing Russian speakers (e. g. Union of the Russians of Lithuania). Also, the LDDP lost support to the New Union (Social Liberals).

Electoral results

Seimas

List of presidents

References

External links 
 Official website archived as of February, 2001

1990 establishments in Lithuania
2001 disestablishments in Lithuania
Defunct political parties in Lithuania
Defunct social democratic parties
Defunct socialist parties in Europe
Organizations of the Revolutions of 1989
Political parties disestablished in 2001
Political parties established in 1990
Pro-independence parties in the Soviet Union
Singing Revolution
Social democratic parties in the Soviet Union
Socialist parties in Lithuania